Pseudorhaphitoma alticostata is a small sea snail, a marine gastropod mollusk in the family Mangeliidae.

Description
The length of the shell varies between 9 mm and 13 mm.

(Original description) The whitish, hexagonal shell has an elongate-fusiform shape. The very elongated spire has an acute apex. It contains eight, rather flat whorls. These are spirally striate  and show prominently six, very sharp, continuous axial ribs. .The body whorl is short), obtusely angulate, and has a constricted base. The aperture is oblong and short. The outer lip is sharp.

Distribution
This marine genus occurs off the Philippines and New South Wales and South Australia

References

 Verco, J.C. 1909. Notes on South Australian marine Mollusca with descriptions of new species. Part XII. Transactions of the Royal Society of South Australia 33: 293–342
 Hedley, C. 1922. A revision of the Australian Turridae. Records of the Australian Museum 13(6): 213–359, pls 42–56
 Laseron, C. 1954. Revision of the New South Wales Turridae (Mollusca). Australian Zoological Handbook. Sydney : Royal Zoological Society of New South Wales pp. 56, pls 1–12. 
 Liu J.Y. [Ruiyu] (ed.). (2008). Checklist of marine biota of China seas. China Science Press. 1267 pp

External links
 Petit, R. E. (2009). George Brettingham Sowerby, I, II & III: their conchological publications and molluscan taxa. Zootaxa. 2189: 1–218
 
 

alticostata
Gastropods described in 1896